Omalisus is a genus of beetle belonging to the family Elateridae.

Species
Species within this genus include:
 Omalisus fontisbellaquaei Geoffroy, 1785 
 Omalisus nicaeensis Lesne, 1921 
 Omalisus sanguinipennis Laporte de Castelnau, 1840 
 Omalisus taurinensis Baudi, 1871 
 Omalisus victoris Mulsant, 1852

References

Elateroidea
Beetles of Europe
Elateridae genera